Leeds International School is one of the leading international schools in Sri Lanka with eight separate branches.  They are co-educational with the medium of instruction being in English.

Leeds International School

The first and largest of the eight, Leeds International School Panadura, currently has 1900 students of all ages from pre-school to upper secondary.  It is divided into a  primary and secondary school, with the transition age being 11 years, which occupy different buildings on the same site in Panadura.

British O levels and A levels are sat by students at the end of their Form 5 and Form 7 classes respectively.  The A level subjects offered are: accounting, biology, business studies, chemistry, computing, mathematics, further mathematics and physics.  The school mainly prepares the students for exams conducted by Edexcel as well as some subjects conducted by University of Cambridge International Examinations. The School was shifted from the city of Panadura to Pinwatta. It is currently situated at Station Road, Pinwatta, Panadura

History 

Leeds International Schools (Pvt) Ltd was originally established in 1999, by Sarath Jayatissa, the chairman of the company, with the inauguration of Leeds International School in Panadura. At present, Leeds has 8 branches across Sri Lanka, with over 4000 students, and the numbers expanding continuously. It would be a milestone in the history of Leeds with the planned expansion into the higher education sector, Leeds Campus of Business and Technology (LCBT).

Branches 
 Panadura
 Galle
 Matara
 Tangalle
 Ambalangoda
 Matugama
 Horana
 Piliyandala 
 Kiribathgoda
 Negombo

1999 establishments in Sri Lanka
Cambridge schools in Sri Lanka
Educational institutions established in 1999
International schools in Sri Lanka
Schools in Kalutara District